Patrick Kirsch (born 1 January 1981) is a German footballer who last played for Preußen Münster.

External links

1981 births
Living people
German footballers
SV Wehen Wiesbaden players
TuS Koblenz players
SSV Reutlingen 05 players
SV Sandhausen players
SV Wacker Burghausen players
SC Preußen Münster players
3. Liga players
Association football central defenders